Theuville may refer to the following places in France:

 Theuville, Eure-et-Loir, a commune in the Eure-et-Loir department
 Theuville, Val-d'Oise, a commune in the Val-d'Oise department